Level 26 is a digital horror novel  series by Anthony E. Zuiker and Duane Swierczynski. The novels include online content, with video elements and an interactive web community; readers are encouraged to visit Level26.com to see this content.

List of novels 
 Level 26: Dark Origins
 Level 26: Dark Prophecy
 Level 26: Dark Revelations

Plots

Level 26: Dark Origins 
Law enforcement personnel quantify evil and murderousness on a scale of 1 to 25, with naive opportunists at Level 1 and organized, premeditated torture-murderers at Level 25. An elite investigative unit, headed by reluctant operative Steve Dark, must track down the killer who is forming a new category.

Level 26: Dark Prophecy 
As a result of the events in the previous book, Steve Dark has crossed the line and considers himself no longer bound by the law in his pursuit of "level 26" killers.

Level 26: Dark Revelations 
Steve Dark faces a killer named Labyrinth, who uses riddles, puzzles, and wordplay to announce his targets ahead of time.

References

External links 
Level 26

American horror novels